Yıldırım is a metropolitan district that covers 399 km² in the centre of Bursa in Turkey. Founded in 1987, it was named after Ottoman Sultan Bayezid I, whose nickname was Yıldırım ("thunderbolt" in Turkish).

It is at the foot of Mt. Uludağ, at 150–155 metres in elevation. Kestel and Gürsu are to its west, and the flat lands of Demirtaş, a subdistrict of Osmangazi, are to its north. The Bursa-Ankara highway passes through it.

The Bursa Uludağ Aerial Lift (pictured to the right) is an aerial lift serving Mt. Uludağ. Built by the Swiss company Von Roll Holding and opened on 29 October 1963, the aerial tramway was replaced in 2013 by a modern and much bigger capacity gondola lift system by Leitner Group of Italy.

With Osmangazi and Nilüfer, Yıldırım constitutes the Bursa metropolitan municipality. 

Yıldırım has 66 quarters and a village called Cumalıkızık, whose well-preserved historical Ottoman architecture attracts many visitors. 

Yıldırım is one of Turkey's important textile production centers. With a population of 629,702 at the 2000 census, it is also one of Turkey's most populated areas; 30% of Bursa's population lives in the Yıldırım district.

Historical places
Yeşil Mosque (Green Mosque)
Yeşil Türbe (Green Tomb)
Bayezid I Mosque and (külliye) complex (Yıldırım Camii ve külliyesi)
Emir Sultan Mosque
Cumalıkızık village

References

 
Populated places in Bursa Province